is a Japanese shōjo fantasy romance manga series written and illustrated by Sorata Akizuki. It was originally serialized in Hakusensha's bi-monthly shōjo manga magazine LaLa DX from August 2006 to August 2011, and was moved to the monthly LaLa in October 2011. Its chapters have been published and collected in 25 tankōbon volumes as of August 2022. An anime adaptation produced by Warner Bros., Hakusensha, Showgate, The Klockworx Co. Ltd., Hakuhodo DY Media Partners, Docomo Anime Store, BS Fuji and Bones aired from 2015 to 2016 - the first half aired in Japan from July 6, 2015 to September 21, 2015, and the second half between January 11, 2016 and March 28, 2016.

Plot
Shirayuki is a normal herbalist in the kingdom of Tanbarun with one unique feature: her beautiful red hair which attracts a lot of attention. Due to her hair color, Shirayuki was raised to always be careful of showing her hair in new surroundings, tying it up with a red ribbon. She grew up to be an independent, young woman. When her hair gets her noticed by Prince Raj, who orders her to become his concubine. she refused his orders, and she cuts her hair and leaves it behind. She knew he only wanted her for her unique hair color, and she escapes to the neighboring kingdom of Clarines. On her way there, she meets and befriends Prince Zen Wistaria and his two aides, Mitsuhide and Kiki. When Zen is poisoned by an apple meant for Shirayuki, gifted by Raj, she successfully obtains the antidote and decides to accompany the trio to Clarines. Shortly thereafter, Shirayuki passes an exam for a position to train in the palace as a royal court herbalist. Shirayuki finds a place in Clarines and works as a court herbalist, and befriends the youngest herbalist, Ryu. Prince Raj realizes his feeling towards Shirayuki and starts working hard to become an ideal prince for her. Over the course of time, Zen and Shirayuki begin to fall in love with each other and eventually begin a romantic relationship, in spite of opposition due to their difference in social status and the external demands of their professions. Later, Shirayuki promises to Zen to wait for him amidst the flowers.

Characters

Main characters

 Shirayuki (Snow White) is the main protagonist was born with rare red hair. She often has to hide it due to how it easily attracts attention. She escapes from the kingdom of Tanbarun after its prince orders her to become his concubine. Independent and persistent, she meets Zen on her second day in the kingdom of Clarines and befriends him after tending to his wounds. Later, she is accepted as a royal pharmacist and trains under Garack and Ryu. Shirayuki has demonstrated her abilities as a pharmacist in various situations, particularly in identifying and controlling disease outbreaks in foreign areas. She has a close relationship with Zen and falls in love with him over the course of the story despite her opposition due to their difference in social status. She moves into the east wing of Wistal Castle and is reassigned as a pharmacist to Lyrias for two years later.

 Zen is the second prince of Clarines and meets Shirayuki on a trip outside the castle. Shortly after befriending her, he is poisoned by an apple meant for Shirayuki, but obtains the antidote with her help. Initially, Zen is often seen escaping his duties to experience Clarines first-hand, though he has since taken more responsibility for official work. He has a close relationship with his three aides, Mitsuhide, Kiki, and Obi, and has both their respect and genuine loyalty. Over the course of the story, he falls in love with Shirayuki and rescues her from various dangers.

 Mitsuhide is one of Zen's closest aides. He was appointed by Prince Izana to watch over Zen (despite initially wanting to be Izana's retainer) and is a skilled swordsman. Though their relationship was initially rocky, he is seen by Zen as both a close friend and a reliable aide. He is extremely loyal though somewhat clumsy at times, as well as a little silly. In chapter 92, he is offered a marriage proposal by Kiki, which he declines. Because of his extreme loyalty to Zen, he doesn't plan to marry, as this may require him to leave Zen's side.

 Kiki is one of Zen's closest aides and arrives at the castle sometime after Mitsuhide. As the heir to the household of the Seiran family, her father expects her to return home to assume responsibility after her time serving Zen. Reserved, independent and intelligent, Kiki is extremely loyal to protecting Zen (and later Shirayuki as she becomes part of Zen's life) and is most often seen with Mitsuhide, Zen's other close aide. Like Mitsuhide, she is skilled at swordplay and is often seen training soldiers or dueling with him. In chapter 92, Kiki confesses and proposes to Mitsuhide, which he declines. She is later engaged to Hisame who has loved her for years, and she seems to be slowly reciprocating.

 Obi is one of Zen's self-proclaimed aides. Originally sent by Marquis Haruka as a way to scare Shirayuki out of the castle, he later pledges himself to Zen after being discovered. It is hinted he has feelings for Shirayuki, but his loyalty to both Zen and Shirayuki prevents him from acting out on his feelings. Obi has a relatively mysterious past as a loner but finds himself drawn to protecting Zen, Shirayuki, and their respective goals. He later becomes Zen's official messenger. With his quick movements and reflexes, he is often sent by Zen to protect Shirayuki at times when he cannot leave his royal duties. He has been seen using the alias "Nanaki".

Secondary characters

Clarines

 A 12-year-old royal pharmacist and trains under Garack with Shirayuki at Wistal Castle. Both Shirayuki and he established a close friendship as pupil and mentor respectively. Due to his youth, he is often looked down upon and mistrusted by others in the palace, even though he is actually a genius. Because of his intelligence, he has a hard time connecting with people his age but becomes good friends with Shirayuki and Obi. He later learns how to open up and trust others as he grows.

 Izana is the first prince of Clarines and Zen's older brother. He has a somewhat cold and sarcastic personality, but is also very responsible and serious when it comes to handling the affairs of the kingdom. Known to be very intelligent, strategic, and cunning, he is later crowned king of the kingdom. He enjoys teasing Zen and initially takes issue with Shirayuki's closeness with Zen, but later comes to trust her after watching her handle a disease outbreak in Lyrias. While in Lyrias, Izana pretends to be a guard using Mitsuhide's name.

An advisor in the castle, he disapproves of Shirayuki's closeness to Zen due to her lower social status. He hires Obi to scare her from the castle, but after an unsuccessful attempt and rebuke from Zen, is grudgingly resigned to leaving Shirayuki alone. His gruff appearance, voice, and personality often scare others.

 Garack is the head pharmacist of Wistal Castle. She is rather eccentric and can alternate between humorous and demanding. Despite this, she is extremely talented and cares deeply about Shirayuki and Ryu. 

 Yatsufusa is Garack's assistant and is often seen wearing a large bandanna that obscures his eyes.

 The viscount is the landlord of a small island on the coast of Clarines. Greedy and selfish, he attempts to exploit the island for its resources and then bribe Shirayuki in making the experiment that will determine its fate fail, but his schemes are ultimately discovered and he is put under arrest.

 A bird trainer from a small island under Viscount Blaker. She came to Wistal Castle to ask Zen's assistance in preventing Viscount Blaker from hunting the birds native to her island. She later befriends Shirayuki, and later proves instrumental in rescuing Shirayuki from the vicious pirate gang 'The Claw of the Sea' (along with Popo, her bird).

 A fellow royal pharmacist training alongside Shirayuki under a separate mentor.

 The second-born son of a powerful noble family and vice-captain of the Sereg Knight Circle. Five years prior to canon, he tried to intimidate Kiki into marrying him by challenging her to a duel to win her hand. He wanted to escape being in service to his older brother, the future head of the Lugis family, by marrying into a different earldom. Though he lost the duel, he continues to show interest in Kiki. Hisame and Kiki formed a temporary marriage agreement out of necessity during the Bergatt incident to draw out those who were attacking Kiki's potential suitors. However, they reaffirmed their engagement after Kiki's marriage proposal to Mitsuhide was turned down. Hisame is implied to have had feelings for Kiki for years, and she seems to be slowly reciprocating.

 Kiki's father and the current head of the Seiran family. He wants Kiki to take over as the family head, and is constantly suggesting suitors for her. He has also imposed a time limit on her service with Zen so that she may eventually return.
 Yuuha
 A worker inside the castle. He insults Shirayuki after she moves into the east wing, which angers Zen.
 Haruto Wisteria
Haruto is the mother of Izana and Zen, and the Queen of Clarines until Izana's coronation. Her husband, Kain, died some time ago, which sent her into a frenzy of work and sickness that caused her to become "allergic" to the castle. She returns for Izana's crowning ceremony, before shortly returning north to Wilant.
 Zakura Shidnote
 An associate of Izana, he has a distinct scar over his nose.

One of the gatekeepers of Wistal Castle who seems to take interest about Zen and Shirayuki's relationship.

 Another gatekeeper besides Kai. He is Kai's senior and just like Kai, he seems to take interest about Zen and Shirayuki's relationship.

 A trainee soldier who is the only one unaffected when the strange disease affected the soldiers in Fort Laxdo. He helps Shirayuki to take care of the other soldiers and befriends her and the prince.

The guard of Wistal Castle who goes along with Shirayuki and the viscount to the watchtower during the test to bring in the bird handlers from Kiharu's island for communication.

Lilias/Lyrias

A botanist in Lyrias, a northern city in the kingdom of Clarines. Cheerful and outgoing, she works with Shirayuki during the disease outbreak and befriends her.

A pharmacist and friend of Yuzuri in Lilias, he works with Shirayuki during the disease outbreak.
Haki
She is head of the Lilias academy district and Izana's fiancée.
Kirito
A boy around Ryuu's age, he is the nephew of Shidan. Kirito helped to in the search for a cure during the disease outbreak in Lyrias after his friends began to fall ill. He befriends Ryuu, though occasionally bewildered by Ryuu's emotionless behavior.

Lido

Zen's only close childhood friend. He worked as a palace archer in order to get close to Zen and lure him out to traitors from Lido. During a confrontation with Zen, Izana, and Mitsuhide, he is killed.

Tanbarun

 The prince of Tanbarun, orders Shirayuki to become his concubine after hearing of her red hair. When she escapes, he sends her poisoned apples that are mistakenly consumed by Zen. After discovering the true status of his unintended victim, he gives Zen the antidote. Raji is rather narcissistic and ignorant and often speaks without thinking. After being befriended by Shirayuki later in the story, he begins to mature as he embraces his duties as a prince. He has a close aide named Sakaki and two younger siblings.
Rona and Eugena Shenazard

 The younger twin siblings of Raji, the first princess and second prince of Tanbarun respectively. They support the relationship between Raji and Shirayuki.

 Raj's close aide. He frequently answers questions addressed to the prince.

 King Shenazard is the king of Tanbarun and the father of Raji, Rona, and Eugena. He allows Zen and the others to go find Shirayuki with Raji when she was captured by Sea's Talon.

 The third son of the Former Earl of Sisk, he kidnapped and planned to "present" Shirayuki to rich people to earn money. He later brings a kidnapping attempt on Shirayuki to Zen's attention and helps to rescue her from pirates. He ends up working for Prince Raji's aid, Sakaki, in Tanbarun.

The Mountain's Lions

Leader of the Mountain's Lions, a group dedicated to eradicating thieves. Mukaze also happens to be Shirayuki's father, a former noble of Tanbarun before his exile as a result of taking back his fiancée (Shirayuki's mother) when she was sent to be wed to his uncle. He held a grudge against Prince Raji since hearing that he had tried to forcefully take Shirayuki as a mistress, and as a result, forced her to flee the country. Additionally, Shirayuki was told that he deeply regretted not having been there to help her in time during said ordeal.

Often mistaken for female due to his "pretty" looks. He is a member of the Mountain's Lions, and kidnaps Shirayuki with the help of Itoya. He befriends Shirayuki when the pair of them are captured by the Sea's Talons.

A member of The Mountain's Lions, he has a scar over left eye. He helped Kazuki during Shirayuki's abduction.

The Claw of the Sea
A pirate organization that is known for human trafficking. Kazuki was once a member, but left the organization after being traded to a rich nobleman. Kazuki and Shirayuki were kidnapped by them to provoke the Mountain Lions.

Umihebi is the leader of the gang. A ruthless and violent woman, she and her gang members were later rounded up by palace guards and arrested in their base in Tanbarun.

Others

An old associate of Obi's, she is surprised by his change after he joined Zen's group.

Media

Manga
Snow White with the Red Hair is written and illustrated by Sorata Akizuki. It was serialized in Hakusensha's bi-monthly shōjo manga magazine, LaLa DX from August 10, 2006 to August 10, 2011, and later moved to the monthly LaLa in October 24, 2011 and is published in collected volumes by Hakusensha. As of May 2022, 25 volumes have been published in Japan. The eleventh volume ranked 21st in Oricon's weekly manga ranking for the week of January 6, 2014.

It has been licensed in North America by Viz Media, in France by Kana, and in Taiwan by Sharp Point Press.

Volume list

Anime
An anime television series adaptation was announced in the 2015 April issue of Hakusensha's LaLa magazine. The anime adaptation was produced by Warner Bros., Hakusensha, Showgate, The Klockworx Co. Ltd., Hakuhodo DY Media Partners, Docomo Anime Store, BS Fuji, and Bones, which handled the animation. The anime was directed by Masahiro Andō and the script was written by Deko Akao with character designs by Kumiko Takahashi. Funimation licensed the series for streaming and DVD/Blu-Ray release in North America. AnimeLab acquired the streaming rights in Australia and New Zealand. An original anime DVD (OAD) was bundled with a limited edition release of the 15th manga volume, adapting three additional chapters of the manga (chapter 41, and both Volume 7's and 11's special chapters), which did not initially air on television.

The second season of the anime television series aired in Japan from January 11, 2016 to March 28, 2016.

Episode list

Snow White with the Red Hair

Snow White with the Red Hair 2nd Season

References

External links
 
 

2015 anime television series debuts
2016 anime television series debuts
Anime series based on manga
Anime and manga based on fairy tales
Bones (studio)
Fantasy anime and manga
Funimation
Hakusensha franchises
Hakusensha manga
Muse Communication
Romance anime and manga
Sharp Point Press titles
Shōjo manga
Viz Media manga
Works based on Snow White